Slender ringtail possum or Small ringtail possum (Pseudochirulus), also known as the ringtail possum,  is a genus of marsupial in the family Pseudocheiridae native to Indonesia, Papua New Guinea and Queensland, Australia. Pseudochirulus live on trees and their diet mainly consists of leaves. The ringtail possums are related to five other genera Hemibelideus, Petauroides, Petropseudes, Pseudocheirus and Pseudochirops.

Species
It contains the following species:
Lowland ringtail possum, Pseudochirulus canescens
Weyland ringtail possum, Pseudochirulus caroli
Cinereus ringtail possum, Pseudochirulus cinereus
Painted ringtail possum, Pseudochirulus forbesi
Herbert River ringtail possum, Pseudochirulus herbertensis
Masked ringtail possum, Pseudochirulus larvatus
Pygmy ringtail possum, Pseudochirulus mayeri
Vogelkop ringtail possum, Pseudochirulus schlegeli

References

Possums
Marsupial genera
Taxa named by Paul Matschie
Taxonomy articles created by Polbot